Ubaidul Haq (2 May 1928 – 6 October 2007), also spelt Obaidul Haq, was a Bangladeshi teacher, muhaddith, mufassir and writer. He was the former khatib of the national mosque of Bangladesh.

Early life and education
Obaidul Haq was born on 2 May 1928 into a traditional Bengali Muslim family in Barothakuri, Zakiganj, Sylhet District. His father, Maulana Zahurul Haq was a notable student of Ashraf Ali Thanwi and graduated in Hadith studies from the Darul Uloom Deoband in 1335. His mother was Musammat Aisha Begum. Haq was the second son out of three sons. His elder brother, Ahmadul Haq, collected old books and was the owner of a store known as the Ashrafiyyah Kutubkhana, which opened in Zindabazar, Sylhet not long after the Independence of Bangladesh in 1971. His younger brother, Mawlana Abdul Haq (1930-2022), was a graduate of the Government Madrasah-e-Alia in Dhaka and is a teacher of Hadith at a Qaumi Madrasa.

Haq first studied at the Ghungadi Madrasah where he was taught Persian books such as Mizan Munshaib by Maulana Shamsul Haq. Two years later, he studied at a madrasa in Habiganj under Mawlana Muddathir Ahmad and Mawlana Musir Ali - both graduates of the Darul Uloom Deoband. Haq then studied at Munshibazar Ayargaon Madrasa, founded by his father. In 1942, he enrolled in Darul Uloom Deoband and received his vocation in Tafsir and Hadith from Husain Ahmad Madani and Muhammad Ilyas Kandhlawi.

Career
Obaidul Haq started his career as a teacher in joined Dhaka's Hossainya Ashraful Ulum Madrasa near Bara Katra from 1949, teaching hadith studies. In 1953, he began teaching at the Nanak Wara Madrasa in Karachi. He returned to Bengal in 1954, joining as a teacher at the Dhaka Alia Madrasa, where he taught hadith studies between until 1971 and served as the additional vice principal from 1973 through 1979. He was the Shaikhul Hadith at Chittagong's Patia Madrasa between 1986 and 1987, and held the same position at Sylhet's Jamia Qasimul Uloom Dargah Madrasa from 1987 until his death.

He was also a professor at Faizul Uloom Madrasa at Azimpur in the Dhaka.

Khatib of Baitul Mukarram
He was the longest serving khatib of Baitul Mukarram, the national mosque of Bangladesh. In 2001, he was forced into retirement by the then Awami League government. He then sought a writ petition which overturned the government's decision.

Anti- terror agitation 
At a conference on 1 April 2005, organised in Paltan Maidan, Dhaka by the Jamiat-e-Ulema-e-Islam he along with the leading ulema of India, Pakistan and Bangladesh declared a fatwa denouncing terrorism.

Later that year, after a series of bombings in Bangladesh he led thousands of worshipers and political activists in a prayer and massive demonstration denouncing terrorism. He remarked that those who were killing people with bombs, were the enemies of Islam and people as well.

Views
In 1994, he expressed concern over the growing support for the unfair practices of Christian proselytizers by non-governmental organisations and the sympathy for them by Bangladeshi left-wing political parties.

On March 21, 2003, he led a large anti-war rally in protest of the invasion of Iraq with Fazlul Haque Amini, where he remarked that: 
The US will occupy all the oil-rich Middle East and Muslim countries, including Saudi Arabia and Kuwait, gradually.In 2005, following the series of bombings by the banned outfit Jama'atul Mujahideen Bangladesh (JMB) while leading the protest denouncing terrorism he remarked: 
Islam prohibits suicide bombings. These bombers are enemies of Islam. It is a duty for all Muslims to stand up against those who are killing people in the name of Islam.

Books
Seerat-e-Mustafa (Biography of the Chosen One, Urdu)
Nasrul Fawaid
Sharh e Shekhwah wa Jawaab e Shekwah
Azharul Azhab Sharh-e-Noorul Anwar Usul-e-Fiqah (Urdu)
Tarikh-e-Islam (Urdu)
Quran-e-Hakim aur Hamari Zindagi (Urdu)
Shia Sunni Ikhtilaf (Urdu)
Quran Bujhibar Poth (Path to Understanding the Quran, Bengali)

References

Bangladeshi imams
Bengali Muslim scholars of Islam
Bangladeshi Sunni Muslim scholars of Islam
1928 births
2007 deaths
People from Zakiganj Upazila
20th-century Bengalis
21st-century Bengalis
Deobandis
Khatib of the national mosque of Bangladesh
Shaikhul Hadith of Al Jamia Al Islamia Patiya